The fifty-ninth Connecticut House of Representatives district elects one member of the Connecticut House of Representatives. Its current representative is Republican Carol Hall. 

The district consists of part of the town of Enfield, Connecticut and East Windsor, Connecticut. Before 2002, the district also contained part of the town of Somers. Prior to 1972, the 59th District included Bozrah, Colchester, Franklin, Lebanon, Lisbon and Sprague.  Enfield was part of the 45th and 46th general assembly districts in 1970.

List of representatives

Recent elections

External links 
 Google Maps - Connecticut House Districts

References

59